Saint-Victor-en-Marche (literally Saint-Victor in Marche; Limousin: Sent Victòr) is a commune in the Creuse department in central France.

Population

See also
Communes of the Creuse department

References

Communes of Creuse